Sten Melin (born October 10, 1957) is a Swedish composer. He started playing the trumpet when he was 10 years old.  He has written about 30 compositions, ranging from solos to orchestral works in a variety of styles. He became the president of the Society of Swedish Composers in 2000.

References 
 Gefors, Hans. "A Man of Surprises."

1957 births
Swedish composers
Swedish male composers
Living people
Place of birth missing (living people)